Blarinella is a small genus of shrews in the subfamily Soricinae of the family Soricidae.  It contains the following three species:

Indochinese short-tailed shrew (Blarinella griselda)
Asiatic short-tailed shrew (Blarinella quadraticauda)
Burmese short-tailed shrew (Blarinella wardi)

References

 
Mammal genera
Taxa named by Oldfield Thomas
Taxonomy articles created by Polbot